Buy the Ticket, Take the Ride: Hunter S. Thompson on Film is a 2006 documentary about writer Hunter S. Thompson directed by Tom Thurman.

Overview
Interviews with Hunter S. Thompson's inner circle of family and friends.

References

External links

2006 films
Documentary films about writers
Works about Hunter S. Thompson
American documentary films
2006 documentary films
2000s English-language films
2000s American films
English-language documentary films